There have been two baronetcies created for members of the Burgoyne family, one in the Baronetage of England and one in the Baronetage of the United Kingdom. Both creations are extinct.

The Burgoyne Baronetcy, of Sutton in the County of Bedford, was created in the Baronetage of England on 15 July 1641 for John Burgoyne of Sutton, Bedfordshire, High Sheriff of Bedfordshire in 1640 and Member of Parliament for Warwickshire between 1645 and 1648. The Burgoyne family who descended from a Burgundian French soldier in the service of the English crown during the hundred years war, had acquired the two manors of Sutton in 1529 and 1544. Robert Burgoyne (d. 1545), the great-grandfather of the first Baronet, was one of the King's Commissioners for the Dissolution of the Monasteries and in 1544 he was granted the lands of the dissolved Priory of Wroxall by Henry VIII. The second Baronet sat as Member of Parliament for Bedfordshire in 1640 and between 1641 and 1648 and for Warwickshire between 1656 and 1658. The sixth Baronet was Member of Parliament for Bedfordshire between 1734 and 1747. The seventh Baronet was a Major-General in the Army. The ninth Baronet was High Sheriff of Bedfordshire 1852 and a Colonel in the Grenadier Guards. The tenth Baronet was a Lieutenant-General in the Grenadier Guards. The title became extinct on his death in 1921.

In his will, Walter Parrott attempted to continue the memory of the baronetage by having Tim Spencer Cox change his name to Walter Tim Spencer Parrott and use the family crest and coat of arms of the Burgoyne family "interspersed" with Parrott's. This was unsuccessful.

The family seats were Sutton Park and Wroxall Priory.

The Burgoyne Baronetcy, of the Army, was created in the Baronetage of the United Kingdom in 1856 for Lieutenant-General John Burgoyne. He was the son of General John Burgoyne. The title became extinct on Burgoyne's death in 1871.

Burgoyne baronets, of Sutton (1642)

 Sir John Burgoyne, 1st Baronet (1581–1657) 
 Sir Roger Burgoyne, 2nd Baronet (1618–1677)
 Sir John Burgoyne, 3rd Baronet (–1709)
 Sir Roger Burgoyne, 4th Baronet (died 1716)
 Sir John Burgoyne, 5th Baronet (c. 1705–1716)
 Sir Roger Burgoyne, 6th Baronet (1710–1780) 
 Sir John Burgoyne, 7th Baronet (1739–1785)
 Sir Montagu Roger Burgoyne, 8th Baronet (1773–1817)
 Sir John Montagu Burgoyne, 9th Baronet (1796–1858) 
 Sir John Montagu Burgoyne, 10th Baronet (1832–1921)

Burgoyne baronets, of the Army (1856)

 Sir John Fox Burgoyne, 1st Baronet (1782–1871)

References

  The Peerage website

Extinct baronetcies in the Baronetage of England
Extinct baronetcies in the Baronetage of the United Kingdom
1642 establishments in England